The West Coast Main Line (WCML) is one of the most important railway corridors in the United Kingdom, connecting the major cities of London and Glasgow with branches to Birmingham, Liverpool, Manchester and Edinburgh. It is one of the busiest mixed-traffic railway routes in Europe, carrying a mixture of intercity rail, regional rail, commuter rail and rail freight traffic. The Glasgow–Edinburgh via Carstairs line connects the WCML to Edinburgh. However, the main London–Edinburgh route is the East Coast Main Line. Several sections of the WCML form part of the suburban railway systems in London, Coventry, Birmingham, Liverpool, Manchester and Glasgow, with many more smaller commuter stations, as well as providing links to more rural towns.

It is one of the busiest freight routes in Europe, carrying 40% of all UK rail freight traffic. The line is the principal rail freight corridor linking the European mainland (via the Channel Tunnel) through London and South East England to the West Midlands, North West England and Scotland. The line has been declared a strategic European route and designated a priority Trans-European Networks (TENS) route. A number of railway writers refer to it as "The Premier line".

The WCML was not originally conceived as a single route, but was built as a patchwork of local lines which were linked together, built by various companies, the largest of which amalgamated in 1846 to create the London and North Western Railway (LNWR), which then gradually absorbed most of the others; the exceptions were the Caledonian Railway in Scotland, and the North Staffordshire Railway (NSR) which both remained independent until 1923. The core route was mostly built between the 1830s and 1850s, but several cut-off routes and branches were built in later decades. In 1923, the entire route came under the ownership of the London, Midland and Scottish Railway (LMS) when the railway companies were grouped under the Railways Act 1921. The LMS itself was nationalised in 1947 to form part of British Railways (BR). 

Further abortive modernisation schemes were proposed, including the introduction of the Advanced Passenger Train (APT) in the 1980s; an ill-fated high speed train which used tilting technology, which was required to allow faster speeds on the curving route, and the abortive InterCity 250 project in the early-1990s.

Geography

The central core has branches serving the major towns and cities of Northampton, Coventry, Birmingham, Wolverhampton, Stoke-on-Trent, Macclesfield, Stockport, Manchester, Runcorn and Liverpool; there is also a link to Edinburgh, but this is not the most direct route between London and Edinburgh.

Originally, the lines between Rugby, Birmingham and Stafford were part of the main route, until the Trent Valley Line was built in 1847; this formed a direct connection between Rugby and Stafford. South of Rugby, there is a loop that serves Northampton; there is also a branch north of Crewe to Liverpool, which is notable since Weaver Junction on this branch is the oldest flyover-type junction in Britain. A loop branches off to serve Manchester; another between Colwich Junction in the Trent Valley, south of Stafford via Stoke-on-Trent; one north of Stafford, also via Stoke-on-Trent; and one via Crewe and Wilmslow. A further branch at Carstairs links Edinburgh to the WCML, providing a direct connection between the WCML and the East Coast Main Line.

The geography of the route was determined by avoiding large estates and hilly areas, such as the Chilterns (Tring cutting); the Watford Gap and Northampton uplands, followed by the Trent Valley; the mountains of Cumbria, with a summit at Shap; and Beattock Summit in South Lanarkshire. This legacy means the WCML has limitations as a long-distance main line, with lower maximum speeds than the East Coast Main Line (ECML) route, the other main line between London and Scotland. The principal solution has been the adoption of tilting trains, initially with British Rail's APT and latterly the  Pendolino trains constructed by Alstom and introduced by Virgin Trains in 2003. A 'conventional' attempt to raise line speeds as part of the InterCity 250 upgrade in the 1990s would have relaxed maximum cant levels on curves and seen some track realignments; this scheme faltered for lack of funding in the economic climate of the time.

History

Early history 
The WCML was not originally conceived as a single trunk route, but was a number of separate lines built by different companies between the 1830s and the 1880s. After the completion of the successful Liverpool and Manchester Railway in 1830, schemes were mooted to build more inter-city lines. The business practice of the early railway era was for companies to promote individual lines between two destinations, rather than to plan grand networks of lines, as it was considered easier to obtain backing from investors.

The following year the London and Birmingham Railway was completed, connecting to the capital via ,  and the Watford Gap. The Grand Junction and London and Birmingham railways shared a Birmingham terminus at Curzon Street station, so that it was now possible to travel by train between London, Birmingham, Manchester and Liverpool.

These lines, together with the Trent Valley Railway (between Rugby and Stafford, avoiding Birmingham) and the Manchester and Birmingham Railway (Crewe–Manchester), amalgamated operations in 1846 to form the London and North Western Railway (LNWR). Three other sections, the North Union Railway (Wigan–Preston), the Lancaster and Preston Junction Railway and the Lancaster and Carlisle Railway, were later absorbed by the LNWR.

Another important section, the North Staffordshire Railway (NSR), which opened its route in 1848 from Macclesfield (connecting with the LNWR from Manchester) to Stafford and Colwich via Stoke-on-Trent, also remained independent. Poor relations between the LNWR and the NSR meant that through trains did not run until 1867.

The route to Scotland was marketed by the LNWR as The Premier Line. Because the cross-border trains ran over the LNWR and Caledonian Railway, through trains consisted of jointly owned "West Coast Joint Stock" to simplify operations. The first direct London to Glasgow trains in the 1850s took 12.5hours to complete the  journey.

The final sections of what is now the WCML were put in place over the following decades by the LNWR.

To expand capacity, the line between London and Rugby was widened to four tracks in the 1870s. As part of this work, a new line, the Northampton Loop, was built, opening in 1881, connecting  before rejoining the main line at Rugby.

The worst-ever rail accident in UK history, the Quintinshill rail disaster, occurred on the WCML during World War I, on 22 May 1915, between Glasgow Central and Carlisle, in which 227 were killed and 246 injured.

LMS era 

The route came under the control of the London, Midland and Scottish Railway (LMS) on 1 January 1923 when railway companies were grouped, under the Railways Act 1921.

The LMS competed fiercely with the rival LNER's East Coast Main Line for London to Scotland traffic (see Race to the North). Attempts were made to minimise end-to-end journey times for a small number of powerful lightweight trains that could be marketed as glamorous premium crack expresses, especially between London and Glasgow, such as the 1937–39 Coronation Scot, hauled by streamlined Princess Coronation Class locomotives, which made the journey in 6hours 30minutes, making it competitive with the rival East Coast Flying Scotsman (British Railways in the 1950s could not match this, but did achieve a London-Glasgow timing of 7hours 15minutes in the 1959–60 timetable by strictly limiting the number of coaches to eight and not stopping between London and Carlisle.)

British Rail era 
In 1948, following nationalisation, the line came under the control of British Railways' London Midland and Scottish Regions, when the term "West Coast Main Line" came into use officially, although it had been used informally since at least 1912.

Modernisation by British Rail 

As part of the 1955 modernisation plan, British Rail carried out a large programme of modernisation of the WCML in stages between 1959 and 1974; the modernisation involved upgrading the track and signaling to allow higher speeds, rebuilding a number of stations, and electrification of the route with overhead line equipment. The first stretch to be electrified was Crewe to Manchester, completed on 12 September 1960. This was followed by Crewe to Liverpool, completed on 1 January 1962. Electrification was then extended south to London. The first electric trains from London ran on 12 November 1965, with full public service from 18 April 1966. Electrification of the Birmingham branch was completed on 6 March 1967. In March 1970 the government approved electrification of the northern half of the WCML, between Weaver Junction (where the branch to Liverpool diverges) and Glasgow, and this was completed on 6 May 1974. The announcement, after five years of uncertainty, was made 48hours before the writ was issued for a by-election in South Ayrshire. The Observer commented that, if the £25 million decision was politically rather than financially motivated, it would have the makings of a major political scandal.

A new set of high-speed long-distance services was introduced in 1966, launching British Rail's highly successful "Inter-City" brand (the hyphen was later dropped) and offering journey times as London to Manchester or Liverpool in 2hours 40minutes (and even 2hours 30minutes for the twice-daily Manchester Pullman). A new feature was that these fast trains were offered on a regular-interval service throughout the day: hourly to Birmingham, two-hourly to Manchester, and so on. With the completion of the northern electrification in 1974, London to Glasgow journey times were reduced to 5hours.

Along with electrification came modern coaches such as the Mark 2 and from 1974 the fully integral, air-conditioned Mark 3 design. These remained the mainstay of express services until the early 2000s. Line speeds were raised to a maximum , and these trains, hauled by Class 86 and Class 87 electric locomotives, came to be seen as BR's flagship passenger product. Passenger traffic on the WCML doubled between 1962 and 1975.

The modernisation also saw the demolition and redevelopment of several of the key stations on the line: BR was keen to symbolise the coming of the "electric age" by replacing the Victorian-era buildings with new structures built from glass and concrete. Notable examples were Birmingham New Street, Manchester Piccadilly,  and London Euston. To enable the latter, the famous Doric Arch portal into the original Philip Hardwick-designed terminus was demolished in 1962 amid much public outcry.

Electrification of the Edinburgh branch was carried out in the late 1980s as part of the East Coast Main Line electrification project in order to allow InterCity 225 sets to access Glasgow via Carstairs Junction.

Modernisation brought great improvements in speed and frequency. However some locations and lines were no longer served by through trains or through coaches from London, such as: Windermere; Barrow-in-Furness, Whitehaven and Workington; Huddersfield, Bradford Interchange, Leeds and Halifax (via Stockport); Blackpool South; Colne (via Stockport); Morecambe and Heysham; Southport (via ); Blackburn and Stranraer Harbour. Notable also is the loss of through services between Liverpool and Scotland; however these were restored by TransPennine Express in 2019.

British Rail introduced the Advanced Passenger Train APT project, which proved that London–Glasgow WCML journey times of less than 4hours were achievable and paved the way for the later tilting Virgin Pendolino trains.

In the late 1980s, British Rail put forward a track realignment scheme to raise speeds on the WCML; a proposed project called InterCity 250, which entailed realigning parts of the line in order to increase curve radii and smooth gradients in order to facilitate higher-speed running. The scheme, which would have seen the introduction of new rolling stock derived from that developed for the East Coast electrification, was scrapped in 1992.

Modernisation by Network Rail 

By the dawn of the 1990s, it was clear that further modernisation was required. Initially this took the form of the InterCity 250 project. But then the privatisation of BR intervened, under which Virgin Trains won a 15-year franchise in 1996 for the running of long-distance express services on the line. Railtrack estimated that this upgrade would cost £2 billion, be ready by 2005, and cut journey times to 1 hour for London to Birmingham and 1 hr 45 mins for London to Manchester.

However, these plans proved too ambitious and were subsequently cancelled. Central to the implementation of the plan was the adoption of moving block signalling, which had never been proven on anything more than simple metro lines and light rail systems – not on a complex high-speed heavy-rail network such as the WCML. Despite this, Railtrack made what would prove to be the fatal mistake of not properly assessing the technical viability and cost of implementing moving block prior to promising the speed increase to Virgin and the government. By 1999, with little headway on the modernisation project made, it became apparent to engineers that the technology was not mature enough to be used on the line. The bankruptcy of Railtrack in 2001 and its replacement by Network Rail following the Hatfield crash brought a reappraisal of the plans, while the cost of the upgrade soared. Following fears that cost overruns on the project would push the final price tag to £13 billion, the plans were scaled down, bringing the cost down to between £8 billion and £10 billion, to be ready by 2008, with a maximum speed for tilting trains of a more modest  – equalling the speeds available on the East Coast route, but some way short of the original target, and even further behind BR's original vision of  speeds planned and achieved with the APT.

The first phase of the upgrade, south of Manchester, opened on 27 September 2004 with journey times of 1hour 21minutes for London to Birmingham and 2hours 6minutes for London to Manchester. The final phase, introducing  running along most of the line, was announced as opening on 12 December 2005, bringing the fastest journey between London and Glasgow to 4hours 25mins (down from 5hours 10minutes). However, considerable work remained, such as the quadrupling of the track in the Trent Valley, upgrading the slow lines, the second phase of remodelling Nuneaton, and the remodelling of Stafford, Rugby, Milton Keynes and Coventry stations, and these were completed in late 2008. The upgrading of the Crewe–Manchester line via Wilmslow was completed in summer 2006.

In September 2006, a new speed record was set on the WCML – a Pendolino train completed the  Glasgow Central – London Euston run in a record 3hours 55minutes, beating the APT's record of 4hours 15minutes, although the APT still holds the overall record on the northbound run.

The decade-long modernisation project was finally completed in December 2008.  This allowed Virgin's VHF (very high frequency) timetable to be progressively introduced through early 2009, the highlights of which are a three-trains-per-hour service to both Birmingham and Manchester during off-peak periods, and nearly all London-Scottish timings brought under the 4hours 30minutes barrier – with one service (calling only at Preston) achieving a London–Glasgow time of 4hours 8minutes.

Some projects that were removed from the modernisation as a result of the de-scoping, such as a flyover at Norton Bridge station, were later restarted. A £250million project to grade-separate the tracks at Norton Bridge that allowed for increased service frequency as well as improved line-speeds was completed in spring 2016.

Infrastructure

Track 

The main spine of the WCML is quadruple track almost all of the route from London to Weaver Junction, south east of Runcorn. The spine continues north in quadruple track until Brinklow, where it reduces to triple track. The line between Brinklow and Nuneaton has three tracks, with one northbound track and fast and slow southbound tracks. The line then reverts to quadruple track at Nuneaton. North of Rugeley, there is a short double track stretch through the  Shugborough Tunnel. The line is then quadruple track most of the way to Acton Bridge railway station, except for a double track section between Winsford and Hartford. The line is double track from Acton Bridge railway station to Weaver Junction (where a double track spur to Liverpool branches off). The line is double track from Weaver Junction to Warrington Bank Quay, but the line is quadruple track between Warrington Bank Quay to Wigan North Western. At Newton-le-Willows, the slow tracks join the Liverpool to Manchester line to pass through the centre of the town, while the fast tracks take the direct route via the Golborne cut-off. There are two more stretches of quadruple track, otherwise the line is double track to Scotland. The first is from Euxton Balshaw Lane to Preston, and the second is a busy section around Glasgow.

The WCML is noted for the diversity of branches served from the spine, notably those to/from the West Midlands and North Wales, Greater Manchester, and Liverpool. These are detailed in the route diagram.

The complete route has been cleared for W10 loading gauge freight traffic, allowing use of higher  hi-cube shipping containers. The route passes through Nuneaton and the Midlands and this area has been called the "Golden Triangle of Logistics".

Electrification 
Wigan to Liverpool via St Helens Shaw Street and St Helens Junction were also electrified in the 2010-2017 timeframe. 

The  to  branch is also in the process of being electrified.

Rolling stock 

The majority of stock used on the West Coast Main Line is new-build, part of Virgin's initial franchise agreement having been a commitment to introduce a brand-new fleet of tilting Class 390 "Pendolino" trains for long-distance high-speed WCML services.  The 53-strong Pendolino fleet, plus three tilting SuperVoyager diesel sets, were bought for use on these InterCity services. One Pendolino was written off in 2007 following the Grayrigg derailment. After the 2007 franchise "shake-up" in the Midlands, more SuperVoyagers were transferred to Virgin West Coast, instead of going to the new CrossCountry franchise. The SuperVoyagers are used on London–Chester and Holyhead services because the Chester/North Wales line is not electrified, so they run "under the wires" between London and Crewe. SuperVoyagers were also used on Virgin's London-Scotland via Birmingham services, even though this route is entirely electrified – this situation is, however, changing since the expansion of the Pendolino fleet; from 2013 onward Class 390 sets have been routinely deployed on Edinburgh/Glasgow–Birmingham services.

By 2012, the WCML Pendolino fleet was strengthened by the addition of two coaches to 31 of the 52 existing sets, thus turning them into 11-car trains. Four brand new 11-car sets are also part of this order, one of which replaced the set lost in the Grayrigg derailment. Although the new stock was supplied in Virgin livery, it was not expected to enter traffic before 31 March 2012, when the InterCity West Coast franchise was due to be re-let, though the date for the new franchise was later put back to December 2012, and any effect of this on the timetable for introducing the new coaches remains unclear.

Previous franchisees Central Trains and Silverlink (operating local and regional services partly over sections of the WCML) were given 30 new "Desiro" Class 350s, originally ordered for services in the south-east. Following Govia's successful bid for the West Midlands franchise in 2007, another 37 Class 350 units were ordered to replace its older fleet of s.

The older BR-vintage locomotive-hauled passenger rolling stock still has a limited role on the WCML, with the overnight Caledonian Sleeper services between London Euston and Scotland using Mark 3 and Mark 2 coaches until their replacement with Mark 5 stock in October 2019. Virgin also retained and refurbished one of the original Mark 3 rakes with a Driving Van Trailer and a  locomotive as a standby set to cover for Pendolino breakdowns. This set was retired from service on 25 October with a rail tour the following day. In November 2014, the "Pretendolino" was transferred to Norwich Crown Point depot to enter service with Abellio Greater Anglia having come to the end of its agreed lease to Virgin Trains.  

In September 2022, following the death of Queen Elizabeth II, locomotive hauled services returned briefly to the WCML once more when incumbent operator Avanti West Coast employed a rake of Mark 3 coaches (hauled by a Class 90 locomotive) to provide additional services to Euston for those wishing to travel to London for the Queen's lying-in-state and subsequent funeral.

The following table lists the rolling stock which forms the core passenger service pattern on the WCML serving its principal termini; it is not exhaustive as many other types use small sections of the WCML as part of other routes.

Commuter and regional trains

High-speed trains

Sleeper trains

Future trains

Operators

Avanti West Coast 
The current principal train operating company on the West Coast Main Line is Avanti West Coast, which runs the majority of long-distance services under the West Coast Partnership rail franchise. In November 2016, the government announced that the (then named) InterCity West Coast franchise would be replaced by a new franchise called 'West Coast Partnership', which includes operating the planned High Speed 2 (HS2) service as well as the existing West Coast Main Line express services. In August 2019, the DfT announced that First Trenitalia West Coast Rail (trading as Avanti West Coast) was the successful bidder. Avanti West Coast commenced operating the franchise on 8 December 2019.

Additional trains during the early morning, late evening, rush hour and night that terminate or start at Birmingham.

West Midlands Trains 
They are all operated under the London Northwestern Railway brand. These London–Birmingham stopping services are roughly one hour slower, end to end, than the Avanti West Coast fast service.

This service was introduced in 2008 to coincide with the withdrawal of the similar Virgin Trains service. Under 'Project 110' this service was reconfigured in December 2012 and to operate 10 mph faster using enhanced British Rail Class 350/1 units.

These are both local branches off the WCML and classified as part of it.

After the Central Trains franchise was revised, London Midland took over services running on the WCML between Birmingham and Liverpool. In August 2017, London Midland lost the West Midlands franchise; West Midlands Trains took over in December 2017. Services on the WCML are all branded London Northwestern Railway services, and all local services around Birmingham are branded West Midlands Railway services.

TransPennine Express 
TransPennine Express provides services along the WCML between Manchester Airport or Liverpool Lime Street, and Glasgow or Edinburgh (alternating serving each every 2hours).

Southern 
Southern provide an hourly service between East Croydon and Watford Junction, which calls at all station on the West London Line, then Wembley Central, Harrow & Wealdstone and Watford Junction. Two trains per day extend to Hemel Hempstead.

London North Eastern Railway 
London North Eastern Railway operates one train per day between Glasgow Central and London King's Cross via Edinburgh Waverley, operating over the West Coast Main Line route between Edinburgh and Glasgow.

CrossCountry 
CrossCountry operates services from Plymouth, Bournemouth and Bristol Temple Meads to Manchester Piccadilly; these trains run along the West Coast Main Line between Coventry and Manchester Piccadilly. Some trains from Manchester Piccadilly to Bristol Temple Meads are extended to Paignton and Plymouth, and on summer weekends to Penzance and Newquay. CrossCountry services between Reading and Newcastle also use a small portion of the West Coast Main Line between Coventry and Birmingham New Street. Services towards Reading are often extended to Southampton Central (or occasionally Bournemouth) and 1 train per day towards Reading is extended to Guildford.

CrossCountry also operates a two-hourly service to/from Glasgow Central, which operates to either Penzance, Plymouth, Newcastle upon Tyne, Bristol Temple Meads or Birmingham New Street. On summer weekends trains from Glasgow Central also operate to Paignton, Penzance and Newquay. These services use the West Coast Main Line from Edinburgh to Glasgow Central.

ScotRail 
The North Berwick Line runs from Glasgow Central High Level via Motherwell to Carstairs and onto Haymarket, Edinburgh Waverley and North Berwick.

Caledonian Sleeper 
Caledonian Sleeper operates services down the length of the West Coast Main Line, providing an overnight services each way between London and Scotland.

Recent developments

Felixstowe and Nuneaton freight capacity scheme 

A number of items of work are under way or proposed to accommodate additional freight traffic between the Haven ports and the Midlands including track dualling. The 'Nuneaton North Chord' was completed and opened on 15 November 2012. The chord will ease access for some trains between the Birmingham to Peterborough Line and the WCML.
The Ipswich chord was opened at the end of March 2014 allowing trains to run without reversing from Felixstowe towards the Midlands.

Stafford Area Improvements Programme 
Planned flying junction and  track diversion in the  – Norton Bridge area. This replaced the previous level junction where the Stafford to Manchester via Stoke-on-Trent line diverges from the trunk route at Norton Bridge, avoiding conflicting train movements to enhance capacity and reduce journey times, additional freight capacity was also provided around Stafford station. This allowed two extra off-peak trains per hour from Euston to the North West, one extra train per hour from Manchester to Birmingham and one additional freight train per hour. The resignalling work associated with this project was due to be completed in summer 2015 and the Norton Bridge work was complete in December 2016, followed by a new timetable introduced in December 2017.

Weaver Junction to Liverpool signalling 
Re-signalling work the WCML spur track from Liverpool to Weaver Junction was underway in 2016. Signal control moved to the Manchester Rail Operating Centre removing five local signal boxes. The signal improvements will improve journey times on this section of track.

Proposed development

Increased line speed 
Virgin Trains put forward plans in 2007 to increase the line speed in places on the WCML – particularly along sections of the Trent Valley Line between Stafford and Rugby from 125 to 135 mph (200 to 217 km/h) after the quadrupling of track had been completed. This would permit faster services and possibly allow additional train paths.  was claimed to be achievable by Pendolino trains while using existing lineside signalling without the need for cab signalling via the use of the TASS system (Tilt Authorisation and Speed Supervision) to prevent overspeeding. In practice, regulations introduced by the HMRI (now ORR) at the time of the ECML high-speed test runs in 1991 are still in force prohibiting this.

In promoting this proposal, Virgin Trains reported that passenger numbers on Virgin West Coast increased from 13.6 million in 1997/98 to 18.7 million in 2005/6, while numbers on CrossCountry grew from 12.6 million to 20.4 million over the same period.

Crossrail extension 
Under current plans, a proportion of westbound Crossrail trains will terminate at  due to capacity limitations; the RUS recommends the WCML extension as it will enable these services to continue beyond Paddington, maximising the use of the central London tunnels. The RUS also notes that diversion of WCML regional rail services via Crossrail into central London would alleviate congestion at Euston station, and consequently reduce the need for infrastructure work on the
London Underground network which would be required to accommodate HS2 passengers arriving at Euston. The Crossrail extension proposal has not been officially confirmed or funded. In August 2014, the government launched a study into the Crossrail extension.

Accidents

Route 

In June 2019 Network Rail formed five 'regions' for helping to support Britain's railways. In August and September 2019, 14 'routes' responsible for the operation, maintenance and renewal of infrastructure were assigned across these regions. The West Coast Main Line runs through two of these regions ("Scotland's Railway" and "North West and Central") and is a part of 3 routes ("Scotland", "North West" and "West Coast Mainline South").

The cities and towns served by the WCML are listed in the tables below. Stations on loops and branches are marked **. Those stations in italics are not served by inter-city services run by Avanti West Coast but only by local trains. Between Euston and Watford Junction the WCML is largely but not exactly paralleled by the operationally independent Watford DC Line, a local stopping service now part of London Overground, with 17 intermediate stations, including three with additional platforms on the WCML.

The final table retraces the route specifically to indicate the many loops, branches, junctions and interchange stations on the core of the WCML.

The North Wales Coast Line between Crewe and Holyhead is not electrified. Services between London, Chester and Holyhead are operated by Super Voyager tilting diesel trains. Formerly in the case of one of the Holyhead services, a Pendolino set was hauled from Crewe by a Class 57/3 diesel locomotive.

London to Glasgow and Edinburgh

Branches and loops

The WCML is noted for the diversity of branches served between the London and Glasgow main line. The adjacent diagram deals with the very complex network of lines in the West Midlands that link the old route via Birmingham with the new WCML route via the Trent Valley (i.e. 1830s versus 1840s).

In the following tables, related to the WCML branches, only the Intercity stations are recorded:

Rugby–Birmingham–Wolverhampton–Stafford

Crewe–Manchester–Preston

Tunnels, viaducts and major bridges 
Major civil engineering structures on the West Coast Main Line include the following.

WCML branches and junctions

See also 
 Castle Douglas and Dumfries Railway
 East Coast Main Line
 Great Central Main Line
 Highland Main Line
 Irish Sea tunnel
 Midland Main Line
 Midland Main Line railway upgrade
 Portpatrick Railway
 Rail transport in Great Britain
 West Coast Main Line route modernisation

References

Sources

Further reading
 
 *

External links 

 Electric All The Way – 1974 British Rail information booklet about the completion of electrification to Glasgow.
 Rail Industry www page which monitors the progress of the project
 Department of Transport – 2006 – West Coast Main Line – Update Report
 Network Rail Business Plans and Reports
 British Railways in 1960, Euston to Crewe
 British Railways in 1960, Crewe to Carlisle
 British Railways in 1960, Carlisle to Carstairs
 British Railways in 1960, Carstairs to Glasgow
 London to Glasgow in five minutes – BBC video, December 2008
 Origins of 1849 stretch of line from Glasgow to Carlisle

 
Main inter-regional railway lines in Great Britain
Railway lines in London
Railway lines in North West England
Railway lines in South East England
Railway lines in Scotland
Railway lines in Wales
Railway lines in the West Midlands (region)
Rail transport in Bedfordshire
Rail transport in Birmingham, West Midlands
Rail transport in Buckinghamshire
Rail transport in Cheshire
Rail transport in Coventry
Rail transport in Cumbria
Rail transport in Greater Manchester
Rail transport in Hertfordshire
Rail transport in Lancashire
Rail transport in Merseyside
Rail transport in Northamptonshire
Rail transport in Scotland
Rail transport in Staffordshire
Rail transport in Warwickshire
Rail transport in the West Midlands (county)
Rail transport in Wolverhampton
Standard gauge railways in England
Standard gauge railways in Scotland
Transport in the London Borough of Brent
Transport in the London Borough of Camden
Transport in the London Borough of Harrow